Xenia, Iowa may refer to the following places in the U.S. state of Iowa:
Xenia, Dallas County, Iowa
Xenia, Hardin County, Iowa, later Secor